Albert W. Ackroyd (birth unknown – death unknown) was an English professional rugby league footballer who played in the 1920s.

Playing career

International honours
Albert Ackroyd won a cap for England while at Halifax in 1921 against Wales.

Challenge Cup Final appearances
Albert Ackroyd played right-, i.e. number 3, in Halifax's 0-13 defeat by Leigh in the 1920–21 Challenge Cup Final during the 1920–21 season at The Cliff, Broughton on Saturday 30 April 1921, in front of a crowd of 25,000.

Post-retirement
Albert Ackroyd retired in 1922. He served as assistant trainer for Halifax from 1931–33.

Notes

References

England national rugby league team players
English rugby league players
Halifax R.L.F.C. players
Place of birth missing
Place of death missing
Rugby league centres
Year of birth missing
Year of death missing